The Neolithic tombs of Northwestern Europe, particularly Ireland, were built by the Neolithic (New Stone Age) people in the period 4000 - 2000 BC. There are four main types:

 Passage graves 
 Court cairns
 Standing Stones
All these types of tomb were built from large slabs of rock which were uncut or worked only slightly. In each case, there was a "doorway" made from two large stones facing each other.

The doorway led to an inner chamber, or a passage and chamber, lined with flat slabs. In all but the portal dolmens, the tomb was then covered in earth and small stones to make a mound.

While some of these stone structures did indeed have human remains contained within them, it is erroneous to suggest that they all were "tombs". It is peculiar to note that after being in use for 3–4,000 years many of these contained no bones whatsoever. Some remains that were carbon dated showed that the interments were inserted hundreds of years after the megaliths were constructed. It would seem that when the original purpose of the "passage tombs" was abandoned, they were adapted for use as crypts by later generations.

Burial monuments and structures